Cychrus korotyaevi is a species of ground beetle in the subfamily of Carabinae. It was described by Deuve in 1991.

References

korotyaevi
Beetles described in 1991